El Capricho is a station on Line 5 of the Madrid Metro. It is located in fare Zone A.

The station is named after the Parque de El Capricho. There is a pedestrian route from the station to these gardens which were created by the Duchess of Osuna.

References 

Line 5 (Madrid Metro) stations
Railway stations in Spain opened in 2006
Buildings and structures in Barajas District, Madrid